West Hallam is a civil parish in the Borough of Erewash in Derbyshire, England.  The parish contains six listed buildings that are recorded in the National Heritage List for England.  Of these, one is listed at Grade II*, the middle of the three grades, and the others are at Grade II, the lowest grade.  The parish contains the village of West Hallam and the surrounding area.  All the listed buildings are in the village, and consist of a church, two schools later used for other purposes, a pair of cottages, a war memorial, and a bottle kiln from a former pottery.


Key

Buildings

References

Citations

Sources

 

Lists of listed buildings in Derbyshire